Exaeretia nebulosella is a moth in the family Depressariidae. It was described by Aristide Caradja in 1920. It is found in Russia (Uralsk).

References

Moths described in 1920
Exaeretia
Moths of Asia
Moths of Europe